The Magnificent Seven is an American western television series based on the 1960 film, which was itself a remake of the 1954 Japanese film Seven Samurai. The series was developed by Pen Densham and John Watson and premiered on CBS on January 3, 1998, running for two seasons through July 3, 2000. The cast of The Magnificent Seven included Michael Biehn, Eric Close, and Ron Perlman. Robert Vaughn, who played one of the seven gunmen in the 1960 film, had a recurring role in the series as a crusading judge.

Plot
Seven men from the western United States band together and form the law in a town that, for better or for worse, needs their protection from the lawlessness of the west. They consist of an infamous gunslinger, an ex-bounty hunter, a smooth-talking con artist, a young eastern amateur, a womanizing gunman, a freed slave turned healer, and a former preacher seeking penance. While they originally band together to protect a dusty Seminole village from renegade former Confederate soldiers (whereas the movie was about protecting a Mexican village from bandits), they later come together to protect a budding town from the constant riffraff that threatens to destroy it.

Characters

The Magnificent Seven

 Chris Larabee: Played by Michael Biehn, Larabee is closely based on the "Chris Adams" character played by Yul Brynner in the original film. His wife and son were murdered before the start of the series and this has turned him into a reserved but deadly individual. He is on a personal quest to find out who killed his wife and son. This is a recurring theme through several episodes in the series.
 Vin Tanner: Played by Eric Close, and based on the role of Vin held by Steve McQueen in the original 1960 movie. He carries a Mare's Leg, as McQueen's character Josh Randall did in Wanted: Dead or Alive. Vin is a former buffalo and bounty hunter and a superb tracker; he and Chris originally begin the group by coming together to rescue Nathan from a lynching. Vin's mother died from putrid fever when he was five years old and he has spent time living among Native Americans. He was framed for a murder he did not commit and has a price on his head.
 J.D. Dunne: Played by Andrew Kavovit, J.D. came from the East Coast where his mother was a servant and he served as a stable-boy; his mother saved money to send him to college, but there wasn't enough, so instead he came out West to become a gunfighter. In the pilot episode, he offers his help to the other men in their fight on behalf of the Seminoles but he is rebuffed. He follows anyway and eventually convinces Chris to stay with the group. He is loosely based on the character of Chico (Horst Buchholz) in the 1960 original, as the slightly off-kilter, hotheaded young greenhorn with little experience but quite a bit of zeal. He is shown throughout the series to look up to Chris but it is Buck who takes the young man under his wing and teaches him how to stay alive.
 Buck Wilmington: Played by Dale Midkiff, Buck is an old friend of Chris' and the womanizer of the group, seizing any opportunity presented to flirt with any woman who'll have him (and several that won't). At one point he reads about 'animal magnetism' in a magazine and it becomes a running gag in regards to his character. He has a great fondness for J.D. and takes the younger man under his wing, teaching him the tricks of the west and offering advice. Buck's character is similar to Colbee (played by Warren Oates), in Return of the Seven.
 Josiah Sanchez: Played by Ron Perlman, he is a preacher and former gunfighter who has trouble forgiving himself for acts he committed in the past, but is an intelligent man providing religious, spiritual and legal counsel and aid to others. In his dress and in his nature, Josiah is more or less based on the character of Levi Morgan (James Whitmore) from Guns of the Magnificent Seven. Josiah provides for his sister, who is mentally ill, and bears animosity towards his father, who was a missionary.
 Ezra Standish: Played by Anthony Starke, Ezra is a Southern con man and gambler with elements of Lee (Robert Vaughn), Britt (James Coburn) and Harry Luck (Brad Dexter). Ezra struggles the most with moral dilemmas as he knows his con-artist ways are unethical. He is one member of the group most affected by parents; namely, his mother, a grifter herself who taught him everything he knows. However, he doesn't seem to realize until he joins the group that his mother's teachings were wrong.
 Nathan Jackson: Played by Rick Worthy, Nathan was a former slave who served as a stretcher-bearer in the Union Army, and learned a great deal about medicine during that time. He serves as the group's healer and has a practice in town. In the first episode he falls for Rain, a girl from the Seminole village the group protects; she later comes back in the second season and their relationship is rekindled. Nathan is an expert knife-thrower and carries a set of three knives always strapped to his upper back. His character has many similarities to the character Cassie (Bernie Casey) in The Guns of the Magnificent Seven, though his expertise with knives is similar to Britt in The Magnificent Seven.

Recurring
 Mary Travis: Played by Laurie Holden, she is the editor of the local newspaper. Daughter-in-law to Orrin Travis, she is a widow with one son, Billy. She plays the potential love interest for Chris.
 Casey Wells: Played by Dana Barron, she is a local tomboy, and potential love interest of J.D.
 Orrin Travis: Played by Robert Vaughn, he is the local Circuit Judge

Guest stars
 Rain: Played by Siena Goines, a girl from the Seminole village with whom Nathan Jackson becomes involved.
 Maude Standish: Played by Michelle Phillips, she is Ezra's con-artist mother.
 Inez Rocios: Played by Fabiana Udenio.
 Maria: Played by Lola Glaudini, she is the prostitute of the city.
 Charlotte Richmond: Played by Kathryn Morris.

Episodes

Series overview

Season 1 (1998)

Season 2 (1999–2000)

Production
The series was largely filmed in Newhall, California.  The pilot, directed by New Zealander Geoff Murphy (Young Guns II), was shot in Mescal, Arizona and the Dragoon Mountains of Arizona, near Tombstone. The pilot was scripted by Chris Black and writer/director Frank Q. Dobbs (Streets of Laredo).

DVD releases
MGM Home Entertainment (distributed by Fox) has released the entire series on DVD in Region 1.  Season 1 was released on December 6, 2005 and season 2 on May 22, 2007.  They also released a complete series set on May 13, 2008.

Awards
Won
 Emmy Award: Outstanding Costume Design for a Series, 1998

Nominations
 Emmy Award: Outstanding Costume Design for a Series, 1998 & 1999
 Art Directors Guild: Excellence in Production Design Award - Television Series, 2000
 Costume Designers Guild: CDG Award - Outstanding Period/Fantasy Television Series, 2000

References

External links
 
 
 The Magnificent Seven Episode Guide at TV Gems

1998 American television series debuts
2000 American television series endings
1990s American television series
1990s Western (genre) television series
2000s Western (genre) television series
CBS original programming
English-language television shows
Live action television shows based on films
Television series by MGM Television
Television series based on adaptations
Television shows filmed in Santa Clarita, California
Television shows set in Arizona
Seven Samurai